The Whitehouse Institute of Design, Australia (commonly known as Whitehouse) is a private Design Institute with campuses in Melbourne CBD, Surry Hills, Sydney and Kangaroo Point Brisbane. It was established in 1988 by Leanne Whitehouse. The Institute offers a Master of Design (M.Des.), Bachelor of Design (B.Des.) degrees, and as well as various vocational education and training (VET) courses, Including Advanced Diplomas, Diplomas, Certificates and various Whitehouse Workshops. The M.Des. degree was first offered in 2014. The Institute's Melbourne campus has hosted several seasons of Project Runway Australia. and has also been the host to Asia's Next Top Model in 2015.

Notable alumni
 Yeojin Bae
 Camilla Freeman-Topper of Camilla and Marc
 Tamara Ralph - founder of Ralph & Russo with partner Michael Russo

References

External links
 Whitehouse Institute of Design, Australia Website

Art schools in Australia
Educational institutions established in 1988
1988 establishments in Australia
Design institutions